James (Ping) Alfred Williams   (May 7, 1915 – September 3, 1987) was a Canadian curler. He was the third of the 1953 Brier Champion team (skipped by Ab Gowanlock), representing Manitoba.

References

Brier champions
1915 births
1987 deaths
Curlers from Winnipeg
People from Dauphin, Manitoba
Canadian male curlers